Trichosalpinx montana is a species of orchid native to eastern and southern Brazil. The Latin specific epithet montana refers to mountains or coming from mountains.

References

External links 

montana
Orchids of Brazil